Ortman is a surname. Notable people with the surname include:

George Earl Ortman (1926–2015), American painter, printmaker, constructionist and sculptor
Julianne Ortman (born 1962), American politician
Len Ortman (born c. 1926), Canadian football player

See also
Ortmann, a surname